Peter Voss, Hero of the Day is a 1959 West German comedy crime film directed by Georg Marischka and starring O.W. Fischer, Linda Christian and Walter Giller. It was a sequel to the 1958 film Peter Voss, Thief of Millions which had been based on the novel of the same title by Ewald Gerhard Seeliger.

It was shot at the Tempelhof Studios in Berlin, and on location in Nice, Morocco, Las Palmas, Singapore, Las Vegas and India. The film's sets were designed by the art directors Hertha Hareiter and Otto Pischinger.

Cast
 O. W. Fischer as Peter Voss
 Linda Christian as Grace McNaughty
 Walter Giller as Bobby Dodd
 Peter Vogel as Prinz José Villarossa
 Ingmar Zeisberg as Dolly
 Peter Mosbacher as Baron de Clock
 Helga Sommerfeld as Mary de la Roche
 Ludwig Linkmann as Lawyer Perrier
 Ralf Wolter as Charley, der Jockey
 Ady Berber as Leslie aus Texas
 Stanislav Ledinek as Präsident
 Lucie Englisch as Haushälterin

Bibliography

External links
 

1959 films
West German films
1950s adventure comedy films
1950s crime comedy films
German adventure comedy films
German crime comedy films
1950s German-language films
Films directed by Georg Marischka
German sequel films
Films set in the Las Vegas Valley
Films set in South America
Films set in Morocco
Films set in Hyderabad, India
Films set in Singapore
Films shot at Tempelhof Studios
UFA GmbH films
1959 comedy films
1950s German films